Relations between Ukraine and the North Atlantic Treaty Organization (NATO) started in 1991. Ukraine applied to integrate with a NATO Membership Action Plan (MAP) in 2008. Plans for NATO membership were shelved by Ukraine following the 2010 presidential election in which Viktor Yanukovych, who preferred to keep the country non-aligned, was elected President. Yanukovych fled Ukraine in February 2014 during the Revolution of Dignity. The interim Yatsenyuk Government initially said that it had no plans to join NATO. However, following the Russian annexation of Crimea and Russian military support for armed separatists in eastern Ukraine, the Second Yatsenyuk Government made joining NATO a priority. In February 2019, the Ukrainian parliament voted to amend the Constitution of Ukraine to state Ukraine's goal of NATO and European Union membership.

At the June 2021 Brussels summit, NATO leaders reiterated the decision taken at the 2008 Bucharest summit that Ukraine would eventually become a NATO member with the MAP as an integral part of the process, and Ukraine's right to determine its future and foreign policy without outside interference. NATO Secretary General Jens Stoltenberg also stressed that Russia will not be able to veto Ukraine's accession to NATO "as we will not return to the era of spheres of interest, when large countries decide what smaller ones should do."  Before further actions on NATO membership were taken, Russia launched a full-scale invasion of Ukraine on 24 February 2022.

Polls conducted between 2005 and 2013 found low support among Ukrainians for NATO membership. However, since the beginning of the Russo-Ukrainian War, Ukrainian public support for NATO membership has risen greatly. Since June 2014, polls showed that about 50% of those asked supported Ukrainian NATO membership. A 2017 poll found that some 69% of Ukrainians wanted to join NATO, compared to 28% in 2012 when Yanukovych was in power. On 30 September 2022, Ukraine formally applied to join NATO, following Russia's annexation of Southern and Eastern Ukraine.

History of relations 
Ukraine's Declaration of Sovereignty, adopted by parliament in 1990, declared it had the "intention of becoming a permanently neutral state that does not participate in military blocs and adheres to three nuclear free principles" (art. 9).

Presidency of Leonid Kravchuk (1991–1994) 
Relations between Ukraine and NATO were formally established in 1992, when Ukraine joined the North Atlantic Cooperation Council after regaining its independence, later renamed the Euro-Atlantic Partnership Council. On 22 and 23 February 1992, NATO Secretary-General Manfred Wörner paid an official visit to Kyiv, and on 8 July 1992, Kravchuk visited NATO Headquarters in Brussels. An important event in the development of relations between Ukraine and NATO was the opening in September 1992 of the Embassy of Ukraine in Brussels, which was a link in contacts between Ukraine and NATO.

A few years later, in February 1994, Ukraine was the first post-Soviet country to conclude a framework agreement with NATO in the framework of the Partnership for Peace initiative, supporting the initiative of Central and Eastern European countries to join NATO.

Presidency of Leonid Kuchma (1994–2005) 

Leonid Kuchma, who became president in July 1994, signed the quadripartite Memorandum on security assurances in connection with Ukraine's accession to the Treaty on the Non-Proliferation of Nuclear Weapons on 5 December. The memorandum prohibited the Russian Federation, the United Kingdom and the United States from threatening or using military force or economic coercion against Ukraine, "except in self-defence or otherwise in accordance with the Charter of the United Nations." As a result of other agreements and the memorandum, between 1993 and 1996, Ukraine gave up its nuclear weapons.

In the summer of 1995, Ukraine requested help to mitigate consequences of the Kharkiv Drinking Water Disaster to the UN Department of Humanitarian Affairs and to NATO. Various NATO countries and other organizations stepped up with medical and civil engineering assistance. This was the first cooperation between NATO and Ukraine.

The Constitution of Ukraine, adopted in 1996 and based upon the Declaration of Independence of 24 August 1991, contained the basic principles of non-coalition and future neutrality.

Kuchma and Russian president Boris Yeltsin negotiated terms for dividing the Black Sea Fleet based in Ukraine's Crimean peninsula, signing an interim treaty on 10 June 1995. But Moscow mayor Yuriy Luzhkov campaigned to claim the city of Sevastopol which housed the fleet's headquarters and main naval base, and in December the Russian Federation Council officially endorsed the claim. These Russian nationalist territorial claims spurred Ukraine to propose a "special partnership" with NATO in January 1997.

On 7 May 1997 the official NATO Information and Documentation Center opened in Kyiv, aimed to foster transparency about the alliance. A Ukrainian public opinion poll of 6 May showed 37% in favor of joining NATO with 28% opposed and 34% undecided.

On 9 July 1997 a NATO-Ukraine Commission was established.

In 2002 relations of the governments of the United States and other NATO countries with Ukraine deteriorated after the Cassette Scandal revealed that Ukraine allegedly transferred a sophisticated Ukrainian defense system to Saddam Hussein's Iraq.

At the NATO enlargement summit in November 2002, the NATO–Ukraine commission adopted a NATO-Ukraine Action Plan. President Kuchma's declaration that Ukraine wanted to join NATO (also in 2002) and the sending of Ukrainian troops to Iraq in 2003 could not mend relations between Kuchma and NATO. Until 2006 the Ukrainian Armed Forces worked with NATO in Iraq.

On 6 April 2004, the Verkhovna Rada adopted a law on the free access of NATO forces to the territory of Ukraine.

On 15 June 2004, in the second edition of the Military Doctrine of Ukraine, approved by the decree of Kuchma, a provision appeared on the implementation by Ukraine of a policy of Euro-Atlantic integration, the ultimate goal of which was to join NATO. However, already on 15 July 2004, following a meeting of the Ukraine-NATO commission, President Kuchma issued a decree stating that joining NATO was no longer the country's goal – only "a significant deepening of relations with NATO and the European Union as guarantors of security and stability in Europe".

Presidency of Viktor Yushchenko (2005–2010) 

After the Orange Revolution in 2004 Kuchma was replaced by President Viktor Yushchenko who is a keen supporter of Ukraine's NATO membership.

On 21 April 2005, in Vilnius, as part of an informal meeting of the Foreign Ministers of the NATO countries, a meeting of the Ukraine-NATO Commission was held, which opened a new stage in Ukraine's relations with the alliance – "intensive dialogue", which was intended to be the first step towards Ukraine's entry into NATO. During President Viktor Yushchenko's first official visit to the United States, President George W. Bush declared: "I am a supporter of the idea of Ukraine's membership in NATO." A joint official statement by the presidents of Ukraine and the United States said that Washington supported the proposal to start an intensive dialogue on Ukraine's accession to the NATO via a MAP.

In April 2005, Viktor Yushchenko returned to Ukraine's military doctrine the mention of Ukraine's strategic goal – "full membership in NATO and the European Union." The new text read as follows: "Based on the fact that NATO and the EU are the guarantors of security and stability in Europe, Ukraine is preparing for full membership in these organizations." As in the previous version, the task of "deeply reforming the defense sphere of the state in accordance with European standards" was called "one of the most important priorities of domestic and foreign policy."

On 20 January 2006 in Budapest, following a meeting of defense ministers of Central European countries – NATO members – Hungary, the Czech Republic, Poland and Slovakia (which was attended by the Minister of Defense of Ukraine Anatolii Hrytsenko) – it was announced that these states were ready to support Ukraine's entry into NATO. As stated, a necessary condition for this should be the support of this step by the Ukrainian society and the achievement of internal stability in Ukraine.

On 27 April 2006, at a meeting of NATO foreign ministers, the representative of the NATO Secretary General, James Appathurai, stated that all members of the alliance support the speedy integration of Ukraine into NATO. Russia, for its part, expressed concern about this development. As the official representative of the Russian Foreign Ministry Mikhail Kamynin stated, "de facto, we will talk about a serious military-political shift affecting the interests of Russia, which will require significant funds for the corresponding reorientation of military potentials, the reorganization of the system of military-industrial relations. Arrangements in the field of arms control may be affected.”

After the Party of Regions received the largest number of votes in the 2006 Ukrainian parliamentary election and the new government, headed by Viktor Yushchenko's political rival Viktor Yanukovych, was formed, there was a turn in Ukraine's foreign policy. By the end of 2006, not a single representative of the pro-presidential Our Ukraine bloc remained in the government. Viktor Yanukovych's foreign policy statements contradicted Yushchenko's course.

Yanukovych's premiership ended following 2007 parliamentary election, when Yulia Tymoshenko Bloc and Our Ukraine-People's Self-Defense Bloc formed a coalition government, with Yulia Tymoshenko as Prime Minister.

Applying for Ukraine to join the NATO Membership Action Plan 
At the beginning of 2008, the Ukrainian President, Prime Minister and head of parliament sent an official letter (the so-called "letter of three") to apply for the Membership Action Plan. At the beginning of 2008 the work of the Rada was blocked for two months due, according to at least one observer, to this letter.

Ukrainian membership in NATO gained support from a number of NATO leaders. However, it was met with opposition from the opposition parties within Ukraine, who called for a national referendum on any steps towards further involvement with NATO.  A petition of over 2 million signatures called for a referendum on Ukraine's membership proposal to join NATO.  In February 2008 57.8% of Ukrainians supported the idea of a national referendum on joining NATO, against 38.6% in February 2007.  Ukrainian politicians such as Yuriy Yekhanurov and Yulia Tymoshenko stated Ukraine would not join NATO as long as the public continued opposing the move.  Later that year the Ukrainian government started an information campaign, aimed at informing the Ukrainian people about the benefits of membership.

In January 2008, US Senator Richard Lugar said: "Ukrainian President Viktor Yushchenko, Prime Minister Yulia Tymoshenko and Parliamentary chairman Arsenii Yatseniuk have signed the statement calling for consideration on Ukraine's entry into the NATO via the MAP programme at the Bucharest summit." The Ukrainian parliament headed by Arsenii Yatseniuk was unable to hold its regular parliamentary session following the decision of the parliamentary opposition to prevent the parliament from functioning in a protest against joining NATO. The parliament was blocked from 25 January 2008 until 4 March 2008 (on 29 February 2008 faction leaders agreed on a protocol of mutual understanding).

US President George W. Bush and both nominees for President of the United States in the 2008 election, U.S. senator Barack Obama and U.S. senator John McCain, did offer backing to Ukraine's membership of NATO. Russian reactions were negative. In April 2008, Russian President Vladimir Putin spoke out against Ukraine's membership in NATO.

Bucharest summit: 2008–2009 

At the NATO summit in Bucharest in April 2008, NATO decided it would not yet offer membership to Georgia and Ukraine; nevertheless, NATO Secretary-General Jaap de Hoop Scheffer said that Georgia and Ukraine would eventually become members. Resistance was reportedly met from France and Germany.

In November 2008, Chancellor Merkel, Prime Minister Tymoshenko and Ukrainian minister of defence Anatoliy Hrytsenko doubted Ukraine would be granted a NATO MAP at the December meeting. In a Times of London interview in late November, Yushchenko stated: "Ukraine has done everything it had to do. We are devoted to this pace. Everything else is an issue of political will of those allies who represent NATO." Although NATO Deputy Assistant Secretary-General Aurelia Bouchez and Secretary-General Scheffer still supported Ukraine's NATO bid at the time. However, the Bush administration seemed not to push for Georgian and Ukrainian MAPs in late November 2008. Condoleezza Rice told a press conference, "We believe that the NATO-Georgia Commission and the NATO-Ukraine Commission can be the bodies with which we intensify our dialogue and our activities. And, therefore, there does not need at this point in time to be any discussion of MAP." President of Russia Dmitry Medvedev responded that "reason has prevailed". On 3 December 2008 NATO decided on an Annual National Programme of providing assistance to Ukraine to implement reforms required to accede the alliance without referring to MAP.

At the NATO-Ukraine consultations at the level of Defense Ministers held at the NATO headquarters in Brussels in November 2009, NATO Secretary-General Anders Fogh Rasmussen praised Ukraine's first Annual National Program, which outlined the steps it intended to take to accelerate internal reform and alignment with Euro-Atlantic standards, as an important step on Ukraine's path to becoming a member of the Alliance.

Presidency of Viktor Yanukovych (2010–2014) 
During the 2010 presidential election campaign, Party of Regions leader and candidate Viktor Yanukovych stated that the current level of Ukraine's cooperation with NATO was sufficient and that the question of the country's accession to the alliance was therefore not urgent. Yanukovych's victory in the election marked a turnaround in Ukraine's relations with NATO.  On 14 February 2010, Yanukovych said that Ukraine's relations with NATO were currently "well-defined", and that there was "no question of Ukraine joining NATO". He said the issue of Ukrainian membership of NATO might "emerge at some point, but we will not see it in the immediate future." On 1 March 2010, during his visit to Brussels, Yanukovych said that there would be no change to Ukraine's status as a member of the alliance's outreach program. He later reiterated during a trip to Moscow that Ukraine would remain a "European, non-aligned state."

As of May 2010, NATO and Ukraine continued to cooperate in the framework of the Annual National Program, including joint exercises. According to Ukraine the continuation of Ukraine-NATO cooperation does not exclude the development of a strategic partnership with Russia.

On 27 May 2010, Yanukovych stated that he considered Ukraine's relations with NATO as a partnership, "And Ukraine can't live without this [partnership], because Ukraine is a large country".

On 3 June 2010, the Ukrainian parliament passed a bill proposed by the President that excluded the goal of "integration into Euro-Atlantic security and NATO membership" from the country's national security strategy. The law precluded Ukraine's membership of any military bloc, but allowed for co-operation with alliances such as NATO. According to at least one encyclopedia this marks "when [the Ukrainian government] officially abandoned its goal of joining NATO", although as late as May 2022 according to a member of the Shmyhal Government (Deputy Prime Minister for European and Euro-Atlantic Integration of Ukraine Olha Stefanishyna) the "letter of three" had "not been withdrawn since then". "European integration" was still part of Ukraine's national security strategy.

On 24 June 2010, the Ukrainian Cabinet of Ministers approved an action plan to implement an annual national program of cooperation with NATO in 2010. This included:
 Involvement of Ukrainian aviation and transport material in the transportation of cargo and personnel of the armed forces of NATO's member states and partners participating in NATO-led peacekeeping missions and operations
 The continuation of Ukraine's participation in a peacekeeping operation in Kosovo
 Possible reinforcing of Ukraine's peacekeeping contingents in Afghanistan and Iraq
 Ukraine's participation in a number of international events organized by NATO
 Training of Ukrainian troops in the structures of NATO members

Ukraine and NATO continued to hold joint seminars and joint tactical and strategical exercises and operations during Yanukovych Presidency.

Presidency of Petro Poroshenko (2014–2019) 
Yanukovych fled Ukraine amid the Euromaidan uprising in February 2014. NATO officials vowed support for Ukraine and worked to downplay tensions between the bloc and Russia, which refused to recognize the impeachment of Yanukovych or the Yatseniuk Government. In late February 2014, Secretary-General Rasmussen reaffirmed that NATO membership was still an option for Ukraine.

As a result of this revolution, the interim Yatseniuk Government came to power on 26 February in Ukraine. The Yatseniuk Government initially stated that it did not intend to make Ukraine a member of NATO. Petro Poroshenko was elected president on 25 May 2014. On 1 October 2014, Jens Stoltenberg took over the position of NATO Secretary-General.

On 29 August 2014, following reports that the Russian military was operating within Ukraine, Ukrainian Prime Minister Arsenii Yatseniuk announced that he would ask the Ukrainian parliament to put Ukraine on a path towards NATO membership. The government has also signaled that it hoped for major non-NATO ally status with the United States, NATO's largest military power and contributor. As part of these efforts, and to rule out future Ukrainian membership in the Eurasian Economic Union and other Russian-led supranational entities, Yatseniuk also submitted a draft law to repeal Ukraine's non-bloc status previously instituted by Yanukovych. Following parliamentary elections in October 2014, the new government made joining NATO a priority.

On 23 December 2014, the Ukrainian parliament renounced Ukraine's non-aligned status, a step harshly condemned by Russia. The new law stated that Ukraine's previous non-aligned status "proved to be ineffective in guaranteeing Ukraine's security and protecting the country from external aggression and pressure" and also aimed to deepen Ukrainian cooperation with NATO "to achieve the criteria which are required for membership in the alliance". On 29 December 2014, Poroshenko vowed to hold a referendum on joining NATO.

A number of joint military exercises were planned between NATO members and Ukraine in 2015. Among them were Operation Fearless Guardian (OFG) which totalled 2,200 participants, including 1,000 U.S. military. Initial personnel and equipment of the 173rd Airborne Brigade arrived in Yavoriv, Lviv Oblast, on 10 April 2015. OFG would train Ukraine's newly formed Ukraine National Guard under the Congress-approved Global Security Contingency Fund. Under the program, the US Army was to train three battalions of Ukrainian troops over a six-month period beginning in April 2015, Others initiatives include Exercise Sea Breeze 2015 (total 2,500 personnel of which 1,000 US military and 500 military from NATO or "Partnership for Peace" countries), "Saber Guardian/Rapid Trident – 2015" (total 2,100 members, including 500 US military and 600 NATO/PfP personnel), as well as the Ukrainian-Polish air exercise "Safe Skies – 2015" (total 350 participants, including 100 Polish military) and military police "Law and Order – 2015" (total 100 participants, 50 of which are Polish military).

In September 2015, NATO launched five trust funds for €5.4 million for the Ukrainian army. €2 million are planned to be sent for the modernization of communication systems, €1.2 million – to reform the logistic and standardization systems, €845,000 – for physical rehabilitation and prostheses, €815,000 for cyber defense, and €410,000 for retraining and resettlement.

In March 2016, President of the European Commission Jean-Claude Juncker stated that it would take at least 20–25 years for Ukraine to join the EU and NATO.

 In July 2016 NATO published a summary of the Comprehensive Assistance Package for Ukraine (CAPU) after the Heads of State meeting in Warsaw. Ukraine declared a goal for their armed forces to become interoperable with those of NATO by 2020; the CAPU was designed to meet the needs of this process. The CAPU contained more than 40 targeted support measures in key areas like:
 Capacity and institution building
 Command Control, Communications and Computers (C4)
 Logistics and Standardization
 Defence Technical Cooperation
 Cyber Defence
 Medical Rehabilitation
 Counter-Improvised Explosive Devices, Explosive Ordnance Disposal and Demining
 Security-related science
 Strategic communications
 Countering Hybrid Warfare
 Security Services Reform
 Civil Emergency Planning
 Energy Security

On 8 June 2017 the Verkhovna Rada passed a law making integration with NATO a foreign policy priority. In July 2017 Poroshenko announced that he would seek the opening of negotiations on a MAP with NATO. In that same month President Poroshenko began proposing a 'patronage system', tying individual regions with European States.

On 10 March 2018 NATO added Ukraine in the list of NATO aspiring members (others including Bosnia and Herzegovina and Georgia). Several months later, in late June, Ukraine's Verkhovna Rada passed a National Security bill: the bill defines the principles of state policy on national security and defence as well as focusing on Ukraine's integration into the European security, economic and legal system; improvement in mutual relations with other states and eventual membership in EU and NATO.

On 20 September 2018, the Ukrainian parliament approved amendments to the constitution that would make the accession of the country to NATO and the EU a central goal and the main foreign policy objective.

On 7 February 2019, the Ukrainian parliament voted with a majority of 334 out of 385 to change the Ukrainian constitution to help Ukraine to join NATO and the European Union. After the vote, Poroshenko declared: "This is the day when the movement of Ukraine to the European Union and the North Atlantic Alliance will be consolidated in the Constitution as a foreign political landmark."

Presidency of Volodymyr Zelenskyy (from 2019) 

Ukrainian President Volodymyr Zelenskyy was inaugurated on 20 May 2019. On 12 June 2020, Ukraine joined NATO's enhanced opportunity partner interoperability program. According to an official NATO statement, the new status "does not prejudge any decisions on NATO membership."

On 14 September 2020, Zelenskyy approved Ukraine's new National Security Strategy, "which provides for the development of the distinctive partnership with NATO with the aim of membership in NATO." On 8 October 2020, during a meeting with British Prime Minister Boris Johnson in London, Zelenskyy stated that Ukraine needed a NATO MAP, as NATO membership will contribute to Ukraine's security and defense.

On 1 December 2020, the Minister of Defense of Ukraine Andriy Taran stated that Ukraine clearly outlines its ambitions to obtain the NATO MAP and hopes for comprehensive political and military support for such a decision at the next Alliance Summit in 2021. Addressing the ambassadors and military attaches of NATO member states, as well as representatives of the NATO office in Ukraine, they were urged to inform their capitals that Ukraine would hope for their full politico-military support in reaching such a decision at the next NATO Summit in 2021. This should be a practical step and a demonstration of commitment to the 2008 Bucharest Summit.

At the end of November 2020, it became known that the NATO Summit in 2021 would consider the issue of returning to an "open door policy", including the issue of providing Georgia with a MAP. On 9 February 2021, the Prime Minister of Ukraine, Denys Shmyhal, stated that he hoped that Ukraine would be able to receive an action plan for NATO membership at the same time as Georgia. In response, the NATO Secretary-General confirmed during Shmyhal's visit to Brussels that Ukraine is a candidate for NATO membership.

Russian military build-up around Ukraine

On 7 April 2021, after the start of the build-up of Russian troops near the Ukrainian border, Lithuanian Foreign Minister Gabrielius Landsbergis told a press conference with his Spanish counterpart Arancha González Laya that Lithuania intends to ask its NATO allies to provide Ukraine with a MAP:

For her part, the Spanish Foreign Minister, despite the fact that Ukraine is not a member of the Alliance, said that the Allies' relations with it are already "fruitful, useful and are a symbol of NATO's vision of a peaceful neighborhood." She also added that the issue of Ukraine should be discussed at the summit of the North Atlantic Alliance, which is scheduled for June this year. Following in the footsteps of his Lithuanian counterpart, Latvian Foreign Minister Edgars Rinkēvičs said on 7 April that NATO should provide Ukraine with a MAP:

At the same April meeting, Stoltenberg said that "NATO firmly supports sovereignty and the territorial integrity of Ukraine."

On 10 April 2021, the Minister of Defense of Ukraine Andriy Taran stated that the top priority of the Ukrainian political leadership is to obtain the Action Plan for Membership (MAP) in the North Atlantic Alliance in 2021. According to the head of the Ukrainian Ministry of Defense, the most convincing and effective mechanism for communicating the position of the international community to Moscow is "accelerating the implementation of the decision of the 2008 NATO Bucharest Summit on our membership in the Alliance." Also receiving the MAP for Ukraine was supported by Turkish President Recep Tayyip Erdogan in a joint declaration of the Ninth High-Level Strategic Council between Ukraine and the Republic of Turkey.

At a briefing in Kyiv in May 2021, Democrat Senator Chris Murphy said at a briefing in Kyiv following a meeting with Zelenskyy that granting Ukraine a MAP would be the next logical step toward NATO membership. He stressed that Ukraine has already made several reforms necessary to become a member of NATO, as well as to carry out additional reforms. He also noted that if Ukraine and Georgia had received the MAP in 2008, there would have been no conflict with Russia at all: Murphy stated:

On 2 June, Zelenskyy called one of the potential threats that could strengthen Russia's position in Europe: the failure to give Ukraine a clear signal and specific deadlines for obtaining an MAP for NATO membership.

At the June 2021 Brussels summit, NATO leaders reiterated the decision taken at the 2008 Bucharest Summit that Ukraine would become a member of the Alliance with the NATO MAP as an integral part of the process and Ukraine's right to determine its own future and foreign policy course without outside interference. Secretary-General Stoltenberg also stressed that Russia will not be able to veto Ukraine's accession to NATO, as we will not return to the era of spheres of interest, when large countries decide what smaller ones should do:

On 28 June 2021, Ukraine and NATO forces launched joint naval drills in the Black Sea codenamed Sea Breeze 2021. Russia had condemned the drills, with the Russian Defence Ministry saying it would closely monitor them.

On 28 November Ukraine warned that Russia had massed nearly 92,000 troops near its borders, and speculated that Putin intended an offensive at the end of January or early February. Russia accused Ukraine of a military build-up of its own, and demanded "legal guarantees" that it would never join NATO.

On 30 November Putin stated that an expansion of NATO's presence in Ukraine, especially the deployment of any long-range missiles capable of striking Moscow or missile defence systems similar to those in Romania and Poland, would be a "red line" issue for the Kremlin. Putin argued that these missile-defense systems may be converted into launchers of offensive Tomahawk long-range cruise missiles. He said that "In a dialogue with the United States and its allies, we will insist on working out specific agreements that would exclude any further NATO moves eastward and the deployment of weapons systems that threaten us in close vicinity to Russian territory." Stoltenberg replied that "It's only Ukraine and 30 NATO allies that decide when Ukraine is ready to join NATO. Russia has no veto, Russia has no say, and Russia has no right to establish a sphere of influence to try to control their neighbors."

On 17 December, Russia put forward proposals to limit US and NATO influence on former Soviet states.

On 11 January 2022, it became known that a group of Republican congressmen intended to introduce a bill declaring Ukraine a NATO-plus country and initiating a review of the advisability of declaring Russia a state sponsor of terrorism. The authors of the bill argue that recognizing Ukraine as a "NATO+ country" will make it possible to quickly make decisions on the provision and sale of American defense goods and services to Ukraine. In particular, according to Mike Rogers, co-author of the bill, this rule concerns the provision of anti-ship and air defense systems. In addition, this bill proposes to create a mechanism for the rapid imposition of sanctions against Nord Stream 2 in the event of a full-scale Russian invasion of Ukraine. The authors of the bill are convinced that in this way they will forever block the commissioning of the pipeline. Also, if adopted, the United States is obliged to consider and vote on whether to grant Russia the status of a "country-sponsor of international terrorism."

On 14 January Andrii Yermak, Chairman of the Office of the President of Ukraine, praised the preparation of sanctions in the event of a Russian invasion, but warned that such an invasion "would be a great tragedy." He also said that the Ukrainian authorities hope to hear specific conditions for joining the North Atlantic Alliance:

On 17 January Russian troops joined their Belarusian counterparts for an exercise aimed at "thwarting external aggression". The exercise began on 10 February.

On 25 January papers a NATO response was prepared which "firmly ruled out Moscow's core demand against further NATO expansion." Russia sought an end to NATO's "long-standing open-door policy for new member countries" and that it remove troops and equipment from Eastern Europe. Dmitry Peskov said that "before there is any understanding of how we will continue, we need to get the text."

On 27 January NATO submitted a proposal to Russia for the security of the latter, "that dismissed Moscow's central demands."

On 28 January Putin said the West has ignored "Russia's fundamental concerns" on NATO's expansion and said that NATO had "strike weapons systems near Russia's borders".

On 31 January at a tense meeting of the UN Security Council, the Washington Post reported that "Russia has demanded a Western commitment to exclude Ukraine from its security umbrella and the removal of NATO forces and equipment from Eastern Europe and the Baltic States" and according to Ambassador Linda Thomas-Greenfield "has threatened to take military action should its demands not be met." Ambassador Vasily Nebenzya denied any plans for invasion and said Russia was within its rights to station troops anywhere within its own territory. He stated "Not a single Russian politician, not a single public figure, not a single person said that we are planning to attack Ukraine." On the same day Russian Foreign Minister Sergei Lavrov said "The main question is our clear message that we consider further NATO expansion to the East and weapons deployment, which can threaten the Russian Federation, unacceptable." Stoltenberg said "Russia has used military exercises before as a disguise, as a cover... military buildup, exercises, threatening rhetoric and a track record... all of that together, of course, make this a serious threat."

On 16 February, NATO's commanders were instructed by Secretary-General Stoltenberg to work out the details of a battlegroup deployment to the alliance's southeastern flank because there were no signs of a Russian de-escalation yet.

On 19 February at the Munich Security Conference Stoltenberg remarked that despite NATO's "strong diplomatic efforts to find a political solution [to the Ukrainian crisis]... we have seen no sign of withdrawal or de-escalation so far. On the contrary, Russia’s build-up continues." He said "we have made written proposals to the Putin administration to reduce risks and increase transparency of military activities, address space and cyber threats, and engage on arms control, including on nuclear weapons and missiles... [Putin] is attempting to roll back history. And recreate [the] spheres of influence. [He] wants to limit NATO’s right to collective defence... and demands that we should remove all our forces and infrastructure from the countries that joined NATO after the fall of the Berlin Wall... wants to deny sovereign countries the right to choose their own path. And their own security arrangements. For Ukraine – but also for other countries, such as Finland and Sweden. And for the first time, we now see Beijing joining Moscow in calling on NATO to stop admitting new members. It is an attempt to control the fate of free nations. To rewrite the international rulebook. And impose their own authoritarian models of governance." On the dais with him was Ursula von der Leyen. Together they proceeded to give an interview to the witness audience.

On 20 February, France and Germany called on their nationals to leave Ukraine.

Russian invasion of Ukraine 

On 21 February Zelenskiy had accused Putin of "wrecking peace talks and ruled out making any territorial concessions". The same day, Stoltenberg advised Russia "in the strongest possible terms, to choose the path of diplomacy, and to immediately reverse its massive military build-up in and around Ukraine."

Amid rising tensions between Russia and Ukraine in early 2022, the Federation Council of Russia recognised the Luhansk and Donetsk people's republics on 22 February 2022, after on 16 February the State Duma called on Putin to recognize the breakaway territories, the deputies passing the motion 351 to 16. On 21 February Putin signed decrees to recognize two self-proclaimed entities in the temporarily occupied territories of Donetsk and Luhansk regions of Ukraine."

Also on 22 February 2022, Russian president Vladimir Putin declared that the Minsk Agreements "no longer existed", and that Ukraine, not Russia, was to blame for their collapse. Stoltenberg condemned Putin's declaration: "This further undermines Ukraine’s sovereignty and territorial integrity, erodes efforts towards a resolution of the conflict, and violates the Minsk agreements, to which Russia is a party."

On 24 February 2022, Russia launched a full-scale invasion of Ukraine.

On 1 March Stoltenberg convinced the President of Poland to forgo sending any fighter aircraft to Ukraine because of the risk of attracting Russian attacks onto its territory, which would likely cause NATO to invoke Article 5 of its constitution.

On 4 March following an emergency meeting of Foreign Ministers in Brussels, Stoltenberg rejected Zelenskyy's request to impose a no-fly zone over the country, stating that it might lead to a full-fledged war between the Alliance and Russia, and he declined to involve NATO, saying: "We are not part of this conflict." US Secretary of State Antony Blinken said the Alliance was "doing everything we can to give the Ukrainian people the means to defend themselves against Russia... Unless the Kremlin changes course, it will continue down the road of increasing isolation and economic pain." The EU's High Representative of the Union for Foreign Affairs and Security Policy Josep Borrell maintained "It’s Putin’s war, and only Putin can end it." Zelenskyy, incensed, replied:

On 6 March Blinken raised the possibility of a three-way exchange between Poland, Ukraine and the US that would see Ukraine pilots fly Polish Mig-29s from a US airfield; in exchange for the Soviet-era jets Poland would receive used F-16s from the USAF.

On 8 March Poland offered to donate 28 MiG-29 fighter jets to Ukraine, "ready to deploy – immediately and free of charge – all their MiG-29 jets to the Ramstein airbase" under US control in Germany. Press Secretary for the US Department of Defense John Kirby rejected the surprise announcement, and said "we do not believe Poland’s proposal is a tenable one". The next day he said the US would oppose any such plan for NATO nations, and termed the idea "high-risk", because it brought into question NATO's "co-combatant" status. The idea was quickly shot down by Antony Blinken and Lloyd Austin. The Polish Prime Minister said on 9 March that any decision about delivering offensive weapons must be made unanimously by NATO members.

Also on 9 March, Zelenskyy's plea was reinforced by Azov battalion Major Denis Prokopenko, who was tasked with the defense of Mariupol: "If a no-fly zone over Ukraine is not provided soon we will not be able to manage the supply of water and food, medicine, as well as to evacuate people safely."

At a press conference on 11 March, Stoltenberg was quoted: "President Putin's war on Ukraine has shattered peace in Europe. It has shaken the international order. And it continues to take a devastating toll on the Ukrainian people. But Putin seriously underestimated Ukraine. And he seriously underestimated the strength and unity of NATO, and of our friends and partners around the world." At the same press conference, the Prime Minister of Canada Justin Trudeau said that "Putin made a fundamental miscalculation. He thought Ukraine was weak, and he thought NATO was divided. He has been shown how wrong he is."

On 15 March 2022, Zelenskyy stated that he did not anticipate Ukraine joining NATO in the near future due to a lack of consensus from member states that it was ready. He said "For years we have been hearing about how the door is supposedly open (to NATO membership) but now we hear that we cannot enter. And it is true, and it must be acknowledged."

On 24 March, the 30 NATO heads of state held a meeting in Brussels and one result was a statement, which read in part:

On 25 March, Stoltenberg was interviewed by Euronews. He spoke of the Alliance doing "as much as they can" to support Ukraine, chiefly "with advanced anti-tank weapons, air defence systems" and with "financial support, humanitarian support, but also military support".

On 4 April, former Chancellor Angela Merkel defended her statement back in 2008 at the NATO summit in Bucharest to block Ukraine from joining NATO. This has been due to Ukraine's political decisions not being met at that time.

On 30 September, Ukraine formally submitted an application to become a NATO member.

Popular opinion in Ukraine 

Western Ukraine has always been significantly more pro-NATO than the rest of the country. Eastern Ukraine is far more anti-NATO and pro-Russia than the rest of Ukraine.

According to numerous independent polls conducted between 2002 and the events of 2014, Ukrainian public opinion on NATO membership was split, with the majority of those polled against joining the military alliance and many identifying it as a threat.   A Gallup poll conducted in October 2008 showed that 43% of Ukrainians associated NATO as a threat to their country, while only 15% associated it with protection. A 2009 Gallup poll showed that 40% of Ukrainian adults associate NATO with "Threat" and 17% with "Protection". According to a poll by Razumkov Center in March 2011 20.6% on average across Ukraine considered NATO a threat; this number was 51% in Crimea. A 2013 Gallup poll showed that 29% associated NATO with "Threat" and 17% with "Protection"; 44% viewed it as neither.

Following the Russian military intervention of 2014, annexation of Crimea and the start of the Donbass War, many Ukrainians changed their views of NATO: polls from the middle of 2014 until 2016 showed that the majority of Ukrainians supported NATO membership.

An electronic petition to the president of Ukraine Petro Poroshenko was filed on 29 August 2015 requesting that a referendum on joining NATO be conducted. The petition achieved the required 25,000 votes to be considered. The president's reply stated that "One of the main priorities of Ukraine's foreign policy is to deepen cooperation with NATO to achieve the criteria required for membership in this organization. Today, we carry out security sector reform in Ukraine to reach NATO standards and to strengthen the country's defense system, which is necessary to counter Russian aggression. Once Ukraine fulfills all the necessary criteria to join the Alliance, final decision on this important issue will be approved by the Ukrainian people in a referendum."

In February 2017, President Poroshenko announced that a referendum would be held during his presidency, with polls showing that 54% of Ukrainians favor such a move.

According to a sociological survey conducted by the Ukrainian Institute for the Future together with the sociological company New Image Marketing Group in January 2022, 64% of Ukrainians support Ukraine's accession to NATO, while 17% do not support it, 13% do not have an unequivocal opinion on this issue. In the West of Ukraine, in the city of Kyiv and in the South of Ukraine, there were the most supporters of joining NATO – 73%, 71% and 59%. This idea is supported least of all in the East of Ukraine – 47%.

Russian opposition to Ukrainian NATO membership 

Russia is strongly opposed to any eastward expansion of NATO. Past leaders such as Gorbachev and Yeltsin had both raised objections, the latter clashing publicly with the Clinton administration over the issue. Nonetheless, the United States oversaw NATO's first round of expansion in 1999. A second wave including the Baltic states followed during the presidency of George W. Bush, who also supported the same idea for Georgia and Ukraine. On 12 February 2008, then Russian President Vladimir Putin said Russia may target its missiles at Ukraine if its neighbour joins NATO and accepts the deployment of a US missile defence shield. Former Ukrainian President Viktor Yushchenko has stated more than once his country would not allow foreign military bases on its territory; as of December 2009, NATO was not planning to deploy military bases in Ukraine.

Prime Minister Putin reportedly declared at a NATO-Russia summit in 2008 that if Ukraine joined NATO his country could contend to annex the Ukrainian East and Crimea.

During a NATO conference in Hungarian Parliament on 20 November 2008, Deputy Assistant Secretary-General Aurelia Bouchez said: "We should not make a choice between NATO enlargement and Russia as we need both" and NATO's Secretary General, Jaap de Hoop Scheffer told a conference in Spain twelve days later: "The emergence of independent states within the former Soviet space is a reality. The ability of these states to determine their own future is a litmus test for the new Europe. Do we have to choose between good relations with Russia and further enlargement? My answer is no – we will not choose, will not sacrifice one for the other. It would bring new dividing lines."

In an interview with the BBC on 18 November 2014, Russian President Putin spokesmen Dmitry Peskov called for "a 100% guarantee that no-one would think about Ukraine joining NATO"; two days later Secretary General of NATO Jens Stoltenberg rejected this call stating it would be "violating the idea of respecting the sovereignty of Ukraine, which is a fundamental".

Request of guarantees of Ukraine's non-accession to NATO 

On 30 November 2021, Russian President Putin stated that an expansion of NATO's presence in Ukraine, especially the deployment of any long-range missiles capable of striking Russian cities or missile defense systems similar to those in Romania and Poland, would be a "red line" issue for Russia. Putin asked U.S. President Joe Biden for legal guarantees that NATO wouldn't expand eastward or put "weapons systems that threaten us in close vicinity to Russian territory." According to Putin, "If some kind of strike systems appear on the territory of Ukraine, the flight time to Moscow will be seven to 10 minutes, and five minutes in the case of a hypersonic weapon being deployed." NATO Secretary-General Jens Stoltenberg replied that "It's only Ukraine and 30 NATO allies that decide when Ukraine is ready to join NATO. Russia has no veto, Russia has no say, and Russia has no right to establish a sphere of influence to try to control their neighbors."

On 1 December 2021, Russian President Vladimir Putin said he wanted to receive guarantees from the West that Ukraine would not join NATO. On 16 December, NATO Secretary General Jens Stoltenberg stated that the Alliance would not make concessions to Russia on the issue of Ukraine's accession. According to him, Ukraine has the right to protection and together with NATO will determine the issue of membership in the Alliance.

On 17 December, the Russian Foreign Ministry unveiled a draft agreement between Russia and the United States on "security guarantees" and a draft agreement on measures to ensure the security of Russia and NATO member states. In particular, Russia proposes that NATO renounce the admission of Georgia and Ukraine into NATO, as well as "any military activity on the territory of Ukraine." Russia also urges the United States not to establish military bases in the former Soviet Union and not to accept these countries into NATO.

On 9 January 2022, following a visit to Ukraine in January 2022 and a trip to the contact line in the east, EU High Representative Josep Borrell wrote in his blog on the European External Action Service website that some of the provisions of the so-called "draft agreements" on security guarantees for Russia, represented by the Kremlin in December 2021, contradict the basic principles of the Helsinki Final Act of 1975, so the willingness of NATO and Western countries to discuss these ideas does not mean their willingness to accept them:

In this regard, on 10 January 2022, US and Russian diplomats held security talks in Geneva to discuss the military activities of both countries and growing tensions around Ukraine. The head of the Russian delegation at a meeting in Geneva between the United States and Russia said that Russia needed "concrete guarantees" that Ukraine and Georgia would never become members of NATO, enshrined in the decision of the Madrid Summit of 2022. Earlier, Russian Deputy Foreign Minister Sergei Ryabkov also said that "the risks of military confrontation should not be underestimated" and that the American side, refusing to not expand NATO, underestimates the seriousness of the situation.

In turn, NATO Secretary General Jens Stoltenberg said that NATO will not compromise with Russia on Ukraine's membership and that Ukraine's membership in NATO will be decided by Ukraine and its allies. He assured that the Alliance would help Ukraine to meet the criteria necessary for membership in the organization.

The lead American diplomat to the talks, Wendy Sherman, stated that "We will not allow anyone to slam closed NATO’s open door policy."  She said that Washington would not give up bilateral cooperation with sovereign states that want to work with the United States, and added that the U.S. government does not intend to decide about Ukraine without the participation of Ukraine, or about NATO without NATO.

On 12 January 2022, a meeting of the Russia-NATO Council was held in Brussels, where representatives of Russia and 30 member states of the Alliance discussed the requirements of the Russian side to NATO. Jens Stoltenberg again stated that the decision on Ukraine's readiness to join NATO can only be made by Ukraine and 30 allies in the Alliance, NATO will "seriously think" about increasing its presence in Eastern Europe in the event of "new Russian aggression." NATO is also ready to reopen its representative office in Moscow, the Secretary General added. Wendy Sherman noted that NATO will not abandon the policy of "open doors". Russia's demands were unacceptable. NATO allies would not agree with the impossibility of further expansion of the Alliance and a return to the configuration of the late twentieth century, which the Russian side insisted on during the negotiations, the US Deputy Secretary of State said.

Deputy Foreign Minister of Russia Alexander Grushko said that NATO did not initially profess the "open door" policy, which the Alliance declares today, if it failed to fend off threats to its security with political measures, Russia will use military measures:

During the first OSCE meeting on 13 January 2022, Russia's permanent representative to the OSCE, Alexander Lukashevich, stated that the Russian Federation would be forced to take measures to "eliminate unacceptable threats to national security" if it did not hear a constructive response to its security proposals within a reasonable time:

Foreign Minister Sergei Lavrov said at his annual foreign policy press conference that Moscow "has run out of patience" waiting for the West's response to the Kremlin's demands for "security guarantees", and therefore Russia is waiting for a written response within a week. Lavrov said the Kremlin would not wait "indefinitely" for a Western response to Moscow's demands that NATO not expand eastward and deploy troops in Ukraine and other countries of the former Soviet Union. Lavrov's comments came a day after the White House said the threat of a Russian invasion of Ukraine remains high, with about 100,000 Russian troops deployed. The next day, White House spokeswoman Jen Psaki said that the Russian authorities must choose which way to go: choose additional diplomacy or, in case of further aggressive actions, face economic measures that will be stricter than in 2014.

In an interview with La Repubblica on 14 January, NATO Secretary General Jens Stoltenberg said that Kyiv had already applied to join the military-political alliance, and in 2008 NATO decided that Ukraine and Georgia would become members, but had not yet determined when exactly that would happen.

On 19 January, Russian Deputy Foreign Minister Sergei Ryabkov made a proposal to the United States to assume legal obligations not to vote for NATO membership of countries whose membership is opposed by the Russian Federation, reducing NATO's non-enlargement requirements. The Kremlin is ready to exchange such an "offer" for the conditions that were put forward earlier – the so-called guarantees of the non-expansion of the Alliance to the east. He noted that the decision taken at the 2008 Bucharest summit "should be ruled out" and that the United States should provide unilateral legal guarantees that "this will never happen". The position that Ukraine and Georgia will never become members of the North Atlantic Alliance, Ryabkov said, is a priority for the Kremlin. According to him, America must have "enough political will" for such a step.

On 22 February 2022 Russia recognized the rebel republics of Donbas, sending its army in the region; finally, on 24 February 2022 Russia launched a large-scale invasion of Ukraine. Reuters reported that around the time of the invasion, a Russian government aide had brokered a peace deal with Ukraine that would keep Ukraine out of NATO. The Russian government denied that any such offer had been made.  Reuters reported it had been declined by Putin, and that it was unclear that it would have had the support of Zelenskyy.

On 30 September 2022, Ukraine officially applied to join NATO.

On 2 October 2022, the presidents of 9 NATO countries expressed support in a joint statement for Ukraine at some point joining NATO, in line with the conclusion of the 2008 Bucharest Summit, while not commenting explictly on Ukraine's application.

Membership timeline

Ratification process

Ukraine's foreign relations with NATO member states

See also  
 Foreign relations of Ukraine 
 Foreign relations of NATO
 Enlargement of NATO 
 NATO open door policy
 2006 anti-NATO protests in Feodosia
 NATO-Ukraine Civic League
 Ukraine–European Union relations 
 Accession of Ukraine to the European Union
 Munich Agreement
 Georgia–NATO relations
 Russia–NATO relations 
 Finland–NATO relations 
 Sweden–NATO relations 
 Serbia–NATO relations
 Russia–Ukraine relations 
 Ukraine–United States relations
 2022 Russian invasion of Ukraine

Notes

References

External links 
 Ukraine–NATO relations
 NATO accession support level chart (2002–2009) by Razumkov Centre
 NATO in Ukraine - Official Twitter account of the NATO Representation to Ukraine

 
Enlargement of NATO
NATO
NATO relations